Scobie Malone (also known as Helga's Web and Murder at the Opera House) is a 1975 Australian erotic mystery film based on the 1970 novel Helga's Web by Jon Cleary and starring Jack Thompson and Judy Morris.

Synopsis
Sydney homicide detective Sergeant Scobie Malone (Jack Thompson) and his offsider (Shane Porteous) investigate the murder of Helga (Judy Morris), whose corpse is found in the basement of the Sydney Opera House. Malone had met Helga previously and discovers she was a high class prostitute who was also a mistress of the Minister for Culture (James Workman) and involved with film director Jack Savannah (Joe Martin). In flashback it is shown that Helga was blackmailing the minister and his wife (Jacqueline Kott), along with a crime boss, Mr Sin (Noel Ferrier).

Eventually it is revealed that Helga was killed while fleeing Captain Bixby (Fred "Cul" Cullen). Malone becomes convinced of the guilt of the Minister, but powerful influences intervene and he gets off. The Minister resigns, citing ill health, and travels to Europe with his wife. Malone criticises his boss, Inspector Fulmer (Walter Sullivan) and is suspended for insubordination for ninety days. Fulmer later suggests he come back, but Scobie elects to stay by the pool for the full ninety days.

Cast
Jack Thompson as Scobie Malone
Judy Morris as Helga Brand
Shane Porteous as Russ
Noel Ferrier as Mr Sin
Jacqueline Kott as Norma Halidon
James Condon as Walter Halidon
Joe Martin as Jack Savanna
Fred "Cul" Cullen as Captain Bixby
Walter Sullivan as Inspector Fulmer
Max Meldrum as Scientific Officer
Ken Goodlet as the Premier
Joe James as the Attorney General
Victoria Anoux as Becky
Zoe Salmon as Angie
Bunkie King as Jackie
Peter McLean as Photographer
Len London as the Police Commissioner
Barbara Mason as Socialite
Faye Donaldson as Socialite
Maggie Blinco as Landlady
Di Bergan as The Maid
David Bradley as Detective
Guy Peniston Bird as Detective
Judy McBurney as Girl at pedestrian crossing
Bryan Brown as Policeman (as "Brian Bronn")

Production
The film rights to the novel were originally purchased by Brian Chirlian and John Shore, who hired Cleary to do the screenplay. Casey Robinson, a famous Hollywood screenwriter who had retired to Sydney three years earlier with his Australian wife, then became involved as producer. He did not like Cleary's adaptation and elected to do it himself in collaboration with another writer. Some key changes were made from the book, notably turning Scobie Malone into a womaniser who lives in a singles-only apartment block and has sex with a large number of women, including air hostesses whose name he can't remember.

Robinson managed to pre-sell the film to America, one of the first times this had been done for an Australian film. US$200,000 of the budget was raised from the Australian Film Development Corporation, with the rest coming from private investment.

"Jack Thompson is a great part of my reason to become involved in this venture", said Robinson at the time. "I have no doubt whatsoever that when this film is seen overseas he'll be turned instantly into an international star. There aren't many male actors like him around any more. There's something there that reminds me very much of Bogart."

The film was shot in the autumn of 1975. One of the women Jack Thompson sleeps with in the film is played by Bunkie King, one of two sisters he lived with in real life in a ménage à trois for fifteen years, with the other sister, Lee King, appearing in poolside scenes.

The film is also notable for the first screen appearance of actor Bryan Brown, who appears early in the film as a policeman, delivering two lines. He is listed last in the credits as "Brian Bronn".

Reception
Cleary was shown the film at a private screening and was not happy with the result. "When I saw Scobie nibbling on the fourth nipple I thought "that's not my Scobie". And I walked out", he said. The movie received poor reviews and did badly at the box office, despite Jack Thompson coming off two hits with Petersen (1974) and Sunday Too Far Away (1975).

Clips from the film were featured in the extended version of the documentary Not Quite Hollywood (2008).

References

External links
Scobie Malone at National Film and Sound Archive

Scobie Malone at Oz Movies

1975 films
Australian mystery films
Erotic mystery films
Films set in Sydney
Films shot in Sydney
Films based on works by Jon Cleary
1970s English-language films